Samrup Rachna is a form of calligraphic art created by Pakistani Dr Syed Mohammed Anwer to promote peace and collaboration in the South Asia region where Hindustani is spoken

The name comes from the Sanskrit words Samrup (सामरुप) (سامروپ), meaning "congruence" or similar, and Rachna (रचना) (رچنا) meaning "creative work or design". The calligraphy is an attempt to use the two altogether different Devanagari and Nastaʿlīq script scripts, used by the same language, Hindi-Urdu, in unison in such a manner that a picture of the word which is written is formed. This work is also acknowledged by Indian and Pakistani print media.

For example, the Hindustani word surahi (meaning "ewer" or "pitcher" in English) is written in Samrup Rachna calligraphy in Devanagri and Nastaʿlīq scripts of Hindustani in a way that a picture of a ewer is formed.

In linguistics, languages which are written in two different scripts are called Synchronic digraphia. Hindustani is one such language. Samrup Rachna is also advocated by its inventor to help readers of Nastaʿlīq (Urdu) script to understand and learn the Devanagari (Hindi) script of the same language. This art is aimed at helping to dispel the existing religious association with the two scripts in the region of South Asia.

A unique linguistic cum calligraphic art book, Samrup Rachna – Calligraphic Expression of Apni Boli [Hindi-Urdu] was launched at the Mother Languages Literature Festival held at the National Institute of Folk and Traditional Heritage ( Lok Virsa), Islamabad, in collaboration with USAID Agency and some other NGOs including Indus cultural Forum ( ICF) on 20 February 2016, by Dr. Syed Mohammed Anwer contains over 60 visual impressions of words with cultural connotations created out of the Hindi Devanagari script and the Urdu Nastaliq script. 
Beautifully presented in hardback form the book is as much a socio-political comment as a coffee table art book. Dr. Anwer  learnt the Devanagari script from his mother. The two scripts are essentially “the same language, written differently” as explained by the artist's mother. The purpose of the Book is to highlight the fact that association of any language or its script with any particular religion is a fundamental mistake.  Language has no religion.  The book can also be used as ‘easy-to-learn’ book for the ‘other’ script of Apni Boli [Hindi-Urdu] by its speakers.

About the Author 

The author of Samrup Rachna Calligraphic Expression of Apni Boli [Hindi-Urdu], Dr Syed Mohammed Anwer is an advocate of the Supreme Court of Pakistan and is a PhD on the topic of human rights from Punjab University. The polymath is also an active member of the civil society and has remained elected President of Islamabad Bar Association in 2013.  He has also written books on human rights, women's emancipation and other social issues.

SAMRUP RACHNA EXHIBITIONS

1.The Launch of Samrup Rachna Calligraphic Expressions

The first Inaugural Exhibition of Samrup Rachna – Art for Peace held in Islamabad from 2-4 April, 2012.
The Exhibition was a great success. Large number of art lovers and citizens attended the exhibition. Ministers, Govt officials, art critics and students came to witness this first of its kind Art Exhibition.
The artist Dr. Syed Mohammed Anwer  while talking with international media Voice of America - VOA explained the idea behind  Samrup Rachna Calligraphy.  He emphasized the need of using art as a tool to promote peace in the region. Local media outlets ARY and Geo also covered the event. 

2. Kuch Khaas The Centre for Arts, Culture & Dialogue, Islamabad

A session was organized with the Artist of Samrup Rachna Calligraphy Dr.Syed Mohammed Anwer at Kuch Khaas Center of Arts & Culture, Islamabad on 27th April, 2012. Dr.Anwer presented his work and interact with art lovers and audience present at the occasion. 

3. Samrup Rachna – Apni Boli Book Launch at Cultural Festival on World Local Languages day, 2016

The Book on Samrup Rachna calligraphic work was launched on World Local languages Day, 2016 at a Cultural Festival held at Lok Virsa Islamabad. Speaking at the occasion Dr.Anwer shared his journey of creating this unique Art work. International Media VOA and BBC covered the launch of Samrup Racha Book at the event. 

4.AMAN KI ASHA Conference, Lahore 2012

Samrup Rachna calligraphic expressions were showcased at “Aman ki Asha” conference held in Lahore from 4-5 May, 2012. The conference was attended by large number of Indian journalists, businessmen and members of civil society. The Pakistani and Indian delegated appreciated the art work by Dr.Syed Mohammed Anwer and admired his efforts to promote peace through his work. 

5.South Asian Scripts, Chicago University USA, 2018

The art work of Dr.Syed Mohammed Anwer was displayed in an exhibition the world of South Asian Scripts titled “ Cosmopolitanism and National Identities” held in University of Chicago from 5 sept, 2018 to 14 Dec, 2018. Few selective works of Samrup Rachna art for peace were displayed for the visitors. 
The art work was admired by the audience., The calligraphic fusion of scripts here is worth our particular notice. While Nastaliq has a strong tradition of calligraphy across the Persianate world, Devanagari does not. Nevertheless, these two scripts had both been used in precolonial times to write a group of North-Indian dialects that had blood relations with each other. Out of this group of tongues were born the modern Hindi/Urdu. As the linguistic boundary between Hindi and Urdu stiffened with the rise of nationalism in the subcontinent in the 19th century, scripts came to be more and more distinctively associated with one particular language and community: Devanagari with Hindi and the Hindus, Nastaliq with Urdu and the Muslims. The idea of a shared history of languages and scripts, however, remains alive. By connecting ‘Hindi-Urdu’ with a hyphen and by calling it apni boli (apanī bolī, one’s own language), the calligrapher provides a specimen illustrating the popular awareness of a common linguistic identity.

6.Samrup Rachna’s first International Exhibition ( New Delhi, India)

Dr Anwer’s works were displayed for the first time internationally at Red House , a cultural centre in Delhi, India. The show took place from August 20-26, 2022, titled 'Give Peace a Chance'. Speaking about the exhibition, the founder of Red House, Arjun Shivaji Jain, said at the time, "India and Pakistan seem to be going through a sort of dementia; we seem to have almost forgotten that we were once a one country. The exhibition is foremost to promote the idea of peace in these incredibly non-peaceful times."
The artists, art critics and other famous personalities graced the occasion. Few notables included Sunit Tandon, Director India Habitat Center  , Prof. Satyapal Sehgal, Art critic and curator Prayag Shukla, National Art Critic & Author Vinod Bhardwaj  and famous Artist/Painter Satya Sai Mothadaka.
Speaking on the occasion Prayag Shukla highlighted the idea behind “Art for Peace” theme of this Exhibition. He said “ This art work by Syed Mohammed Anwer is unique and awesome. These amazing calligraphic works take you to the  core of  the idea ,how man kept creating scripts and alphabets to address and communicate with another human being in different parts of the world, in different languages  for the love, for friendship and peace. He reiterated while speaking at the time of inauguration of the show, that the scripts and their ways of writing  them, with different tools, devices , may change, as they have changed drastically ,   in our times with  the use of mobiles, laptops, computers ,yet the' word'  will remain and the magic of writing it by hand will also remain , as is evident from this show also. Visually  enthralling, aesthetically satisfying these works create images by  using the letters , used by urdu ,and devnagari scripts in this vast land and continent of ours”. Nirupama Dutt in her article “Roundabout | Words twine, pine to send notes of love, peace” published in Hindustan Times explained the need of these exhibitions to promote peace through art. 

7. Samrup Rachna Calligraphy Exhibition, Pubjab Kala Bhawan, Chandigarh, India

An Exhibition of Samrup Rachna Calligraphic Expressions by Dr Syed Mohammed Anwer was held with collaboration of Red House  at Punjab Kala Bhawan , Chandigarh, India from 24-26 February, 2023. The Exhibition was themed as “ Give Peace a Chance” . The Exhibition  was attended by notable Artists, Academia and media personalities like  Prof Sehgal, Nirupama Dutt, Rana Nayar, Surjeet Singh. Amy Singh etc. Civil society of India strongly and actively support this art for Peace Samrup Rachna. Art lovers from Chandigarh came in large numbers and appreciated this unique Art by Dr Syed Mohammed Anwer. 

8. Samrup Rachna Art displayed at Walled City Lahore , Shahi Hammam 

Samrup Rachna Calligraphic expressions created by Dr.Syed Mohammed Anwer are now on display at Shahi Hammam, Walled City Lahore [] with the theme of "Art for Peace". The visitors can now get souvenirs of Samrup Rachna including framed Artwork from Craft House Delhi Gate, Walled City Lahore.

References

Writing systems of Asia
Calligraphy
South Asia